Jo Jin-ho (born April 17, 1992), commonly known by the mononym Jinho, is a South Korean singer, lyricist, dancer, composer, vocal coach and member of South Korean boy group Pentagon under Cube Entertainment. He is a former SM Entertainment trainee and member of the project group SM the Ballad. After leaving SM Entertainment in 2015, Jinho became a vocal coach. Since then, he has trained Cube labelmates (G)I-dle and Yoo Seon-ho, among others.

Early life 
Jinho was born in Bucheon, South Korea on April 17, 1992. When he was seven, his family moved to Daejeon. At the age of 15, he lived in Qingdao, China, for eight months due to family and work before settling in Seoul.

He decided to become a singer after watching Brian McKnight and Johan Kim perform a duet of McKnight's "One Last Cry."

Career

2008–2014: Everysing win and SM the Ballad 
In 2008, Jinho won first place in the SM Everysing Contest. He later became a trainee through SM Entertainment's casting system in the same year.

In November 2010, Jinho, under the name Jino, made his debut as a member of SM the Ballad alongside Super Junior's Kyuhyun, Shinee's Jonghyun, and TraxX's Jay. The group had great reception, and their debut EP Miss You reached number one on the Gaon Album Chart. He was then preparing to debut in another group, but plans fell through and the group was ultimately not formed. In 2013, he was cast in the musical Summer Snow.

2015–present: Departing SM Entertainment, debut with Pentagon and musical roles 

In 2015, Jinho left SM Entertainment and began working as a singing tutor at Modern K Academy. Modern K Academy encouraged Jinho to audition at Cube, as their CEO has close connections with Cube Entertainment and had a hand in creating Pentagon, being in charge of talent development. In February, he was part of a vocal project group, Seorin-dong Children (서린동 아이들) with Hui and another female singer. The group wasn't originally supposed to consist of them, but after receiving a good response from Cube Artist Development for the recorded guide, the company decided to release it on streaming sites. In February 2016, Jinho was featured in K.Shin's song "Perception" alongside Hwang Sung-dae under the name Mush. The name was intended to be Mu$h, but he forgot to tell K.Shin to add a dollar sign instead of an 's'.

Making it through the audition process, Jinho participated in Pentagon Maker making it to the final lineup and debuting with the group on October 10, 2016.

In 2017, Jinho started a personal project titled "Magazine Ho" releasing covers in various genres and languages on the last of each month. With this project he has worked with and featured other artists such as CLC's Sorn, (G)I-dle's Jeon So-yeon, HYNN, and band mates Hongseok, Shinwon, Hui, Kino, and Yeo One.

On March 17, 2018, Jinho held his first mini live concert which is a part of his Magazine Ho cover songs project.

In September, it was announced that Jinho would star in the musical Iron Mask as Raul, the son of Athos who admires his father and dreams of becoming a royal general. The musical ran from September 13 to November 18 at the Kwanglim Art Center, Seoul. He rotated the role with musical actor, Shin Hyun-mook and actor Yoo Hyun-seok.

On December 17, 2018, Cube announced his second mini live concert "Magazine Ho Vol.2 - Ready Ho" would be on the 19th of January 2019 at Ilchi Art Hall, and it sold out in seconds. Members Hongseok and Kino were present as special guests during the concert.

Jinho was cast in his fourth musical, Goddess is Watching You. He played as the role of an innocent and pure North Korean soldier Ryu Soon Ho, who overcomes his trauma due to war with the belief in a goddess. The musical ran from November 14, 2019 to February 26, 2020 at the Daehangno Arts Theater in Seoul.

Jinho held his 3rd solo mini live concert, "Magazine Ho Vol.3 - Off Stage" on January 11, 2020. Due to high demand from fans, Cube Entertainment added an additional date to the concert. Jinho is set to open the first performance on January 10 to meet more fans. He sang an unreleased song, "Gravity" together with member Kino which was composed and written by Kino. Members Hui, Hongseok and Yeo One were also present as special guest. In March, Jinho appeared on Mnet's music talk show Studio Music Hall 2. He was introduced as "high note terminator" performing a duet of Kim Kwang-seok's "At About Thirty" with Hui.

Personal life

Mandatory military service
As part of his mandatory military service, Jinho enlisted as an active duty soldier on May 11, 2020. Jinho prepared a small gift, "I'm Here", a self-composed solo song for his friends and bandmates who are running toward their dreams. Jinho explained, "When people are faced by exhaustion and discouragement, they bring back the old self of the day when they first dreamt of a dream. I hope that the voice of Pentagon's Jinho with the words 'You are doing great, so don't worry', will comfort everyone who listens to this song." The song was made before he enlisted, and only available through We:th physical album.

On September 29, 2021, Jinho's agency announced that he will be discharged from military service on November 14, 2021, without returning to the unit after his final vacation, according to the Ministry guidelines for preventing the spread of COVID-19.

Discography

Writing and production credits 
All credits are adapted from the Korea Music Copyright Association, unless stated otherwise.

Filmography

Television series

Variety shows

Theater

Concerts

Awards and nominations

References

External links
 

1992 births
Living people
People from Bucheon
South Korean pop singers
21st-century South Korean  male singers
South Korean male idols
Cube Entertainment artists
Pentagon (South Korean band) members